Hong Kong singer Jason Chan (Chinese: 陳柏宇) has released 12 studio albums, one EP, three compilation albums (including a soundtrack), 56 singles and made other appearances as a featured artist. He made his chart debut with the single "Stubborn" in 2006, and has since released many chart-topping songs.

Albums

Studio albums

Compilation albums

Live albums

Reissued Albums

Extended plays

Singles

As main artist 

(*)Still on music chart

"—" denotes a recording that did not chart or was not released to that station

As featured artist

Other charted songs

References

Chan, Jason